There were five Spanish regional elections held in Spain in 2012:

2012 Andalusian regional election
2012 Asturian regional election
2012 Basque regional election
2012 Galician regional election
2012 Catalan regional election